Peter Herman Leto is an American television director and television producer. He is best known for directing work on Law & Order: Special Victims Unit, in which he also served as a unit production manager, first assistant director, second assistant director, co-producer, producer, supervising producer and co-executive producer.

Besides Law & Order: Special Victims Unit, Leto's other television directing work includes A Gifted Man, Under the Dome, Witches of East End, Arrow, Falling Skies, Agent Carter, Designated Survivor, Emergence, Deputy and The Equalizer.

Leto also worked as the second assistant director on the feature films The Last Days of Disco, Rounders, Passion of Mind, Boiler Room and the Law & Order television film Exiled: A Law & Order Movie.

References

External links

American television directors
American television producers
Living people
Place of birth missing (living people)
Year of birth missing (living people)